"Wonderwall" is a song by English rock band Oasis. It was written by Noel Gallagher. The song was produced by Gallagher and Owen Morris for the band's second studio album (What's the Story) Morning Glory?, released in 1995. According to Gallagher, "Wonderwall" describes "an imaginary friend who's gonna come and save you from yourself".

The song was released as the fourth single from the album on 30 October 1995. "Wonderwall" topped the charts in Australia and New Zealand and reached the top 10 in 13 other countries, including Canada and the United States at  5 and No. 8, respectively, as well as No. 2 on both the UK Singles Chart and the Irish Singles Chart. The single was certified sextuple platinum by the British Phonographic Industry and gold by the Recording Industry Association of America.

It remains one of the band's most popular songs, and was voted No. 1 on the Australian alternative music radio station Triple J's "20 Years of the Hottest 100" in 2013. Many artists have also covered the song, such as Ryan Adams, Cat Power, and Brad Mehldau. In October 2020, it became the first song from the 1990s to reach one billion streams on Spotify.

Production history
The song was originally titled "Wishing Stone". Gallagher told NME in 1996 that "Wonderwall" was written for Meg Mathews, his then-girlfriend and later wife. However, after Gallagher and Mathews divorced in 2001, he said the song was not about her: "The meaning of that song was taken away from me by the media who jumped on it, and how do you tell your Mrs it's not about her once she's read it is? It's a song about an imaginary friend who's gonna come and save you from yourself." The song's final title was inspired by George Harrison's solo album Wonderwall Music.

The song was recorded at Rockfield Studios in Wales, during a two-week recording of the Morning Glory album in May 1995. Morris produced the song in a half-day along with Gallagher, using a technique known as "brickwalling" to intensify the sound of the song. Liam Gallagher served as lead singer on the song after Noel had given him a choice between "Wonderwall" and "Don't Look Back in Anger", another single from the album, with Noel singing lead vocals on the latter. All of the band's members except bassist Paul "Guigsy" McGuigan contributed to the recording, with Noel playing bass instead of McGuigan. This decision displeased Liam, who told Morris, "That's not Oasis."

"Wonderwall" is written in the key of F minor and is set in common time with a moderate dance groove. Gallagher's voice ranges from an E3 to an F4 in the song.

Live performances

Noel Gallagher debuted the song on UK television backstage at Glastonbury, and it was broadcast on Channel 4 on 24 June 1995. The song was not performed by the band during their headline performance the night before. The song went on to be regularly played on the (What's the Story) Morning Glory? Tour where it was typically played and sung solo by Noel acoustically. On occasions however (including the Maine Road and Knebworth gigs) it was played full band acoustically with Liam on vocals. The song was also regularly played on both the Be Here Now Tour and Standing on the Shoulder of Giants Tour, performances on these tours featured the full band on electric guitars with Liam on vocals.

For the Heathen Chemistry Tour, Noel changed the arrangement of his live performances of the song to a style he admitted was heavily influenced by Ryan Adams' cover. For the Don't Believe the Truth Tour, the original arrangement was used for live performances by the full band with electric guitars and Liam on vocals. During the 2008 tour, the band returned to performing the song in a semi-acoustic form, in an arrangement closely resembling the album version. This song was also performed during the 2012 Summer Olympics closing ceremony by Liam Gallagher and his post Oasis band Beady Eye.

Since Oasis split up, both Noel and Liam have continued to play the song as part of Noel Gallagher's High Flying Birds and Liam's solo career, respectively. Both have often varied the presentation of the song, sometimes being performed in stripped down acoustic versions, whilst other times more full band arrangements have been performed.

Critical reception
Steve Baltin from Cash Box picked "Wonderwall" as Pick of the Week, describing it as "a perfect example of melodic pop." He added, "Following the more uptempo riff of “Morning Glory”, this single will remind listeners of the anthemic single “Live Forever’’, a track that generated massive airplay on multiple formats last year. Look for the same results for this lovely near ballad. A simple, sweet song, it shows why Oasis is rapidly becoming one of music’s great singles bands." Pan-European magazine Music & Media wrote, "A swirling rock song that slowly builds to epic proportions. Nicely chiming acoustic guitars and psyched-up strings support Liam Gallagher's trademark declamatory and plaintive vocals. Not the easiest song for EHR, but a sure grower."

Music video
The original music video to the song conceived by Johanna Bautista was filmed by director Nigel Dick at Unit 217B in Woolwich, London, on 30 September 1995. The filming of the promotional video took place during the brief period when bassist Guigsy quit the band due to nervous exhaustion, and was replaced by Scott McLeod, who appears in the video along with the four other members of the band. The song won British Video of the Year at the 1996 Brit Awards.

A second video depicts the band sitting down throughout the video with some getting up and leaving before returning. The video ends with Noel, Alan White and Scott McLeod leaving their seats, leaving Liam and Paul "Bonehead" Arthurs in their seats.

There are two versions of the video: one posted online by Vevo that has reached over 436 million views, and one posted by the band themselves that has reached 476 million views for a total of 912 million views, making it the most popular Oasis video online.

Cover art
The sleeve artwork was inspired by the paintings of the Belgian surrealist René Magritte, and was shot on Primrose Hill in London by Michael Spencer Jones. The hand holding the frame is that of art director Brian Cannon. The original idea was to have Liam in the frame before Noel vetoed that idea whilst the shoot was taking place. Instead, a female figure was deemed necessary, so Creation Records employee Anita Heryet was asked to stand in as cover star for the shot.

Chart and sales performance
"Wonderwall" reached the No. 2 spot in both Ireland and the United Kingdom in October and November 1995. In the UK, the song was held off the top spot by "I Believe" by Robson & Jerome. "Wonderwall" finished at No. 10 on the year-end chart for 1995 and at No. 26 on the 1990s decade-end in the UK. The track has sold 3.6 million copies in the UK as of April 2022, certifying the song sextuple platinum and making it Oasis' biggest-selling song in their homeland.

In the United States, the song peaked at No. 1 on the Modern Rock Tracks chart for a then-unprecedented ten weeks and reached No. 8 on the Billboard Hot 100 in March 1996, becoming their only top-10 hit on the latter chart. "Wonderwall" also proved to be a major hit in Australia and New Zealand, claiming the No. 1 spot in both countries. In Canada, the song reached No. 5 on the RPM 100 chart and topped the RPM Alternative 30 ranking.

Awards and accolades
 The American magazine The Village Voices Pazz & Jop critics' poll ranked "Wonderwall" at No. 11 on its annual year-end poll in 1995. The following year, "Wonderwall" was ranked at No. 4, tied with Pulps "Common People".
 In the Grammy Awards of 1997, the band received a nomination for Best Rock Vocal Performance by a Duo or Group, and Noel Gallagher picked up an additional nomination for Best Rock Song, winning neither.
 In May 2005, "Wonderwall" was voted the best British song of all time, in a poll of over 8,500 listeners conducted by Virgin Radio.
 In August 2006, "Wonderwall" was named the second-greatest song of all time in a poll conducted by Q Magazine, finishing behind another Oasis song, "Live Forever".
 In 2006, U2's guitarist The Edge named "Wonderwall" one of the songs he most wishes he'd written.
 In May 2007, NME magazine placed "Wonderwall" at No. 27 on its list of the 50 Greatest Indie Anthems Ever.
 On 28 June 2007, NME stated that Alex James, bassist of Blur, who had been long-standing rivals with Oasis, said: "Wish I'd written it. He's got a great voice, Liam (Gallagher)".
 In July 2009, "Wonderwall" was voted at No. 12 in the Hottest 100 of all time countdown poll, conducted by Australian radio station Triple J. More than half a million votes were cast.
 In February 2014, the song was voted No. 36 of The 500 greatest songs of all time, according to NME.
 In March 2016, "Wonderwall" was voted the greatest British song of all time by Radio X listeners.
In September 2021, Rolling Stone placed the song at No. 95 on its list of the 500 Greatest Songs of All Time.

Track listings

Personnel
 Liam Gallagher – vocals, tambourine
 Noel Gallagher – backing vocals, acoustic and electric guitars, bass, piano
 Paul "Bonehead" Arthurs – mellotron
 Alan White – drums

Charts

Weekly charts

Year-end charts

Decade-end charts

Certifications

Release history

The Mike Flowers Pops version

British band the Mike Flowers Pops released an easy listening version that reached No. 2 on the UK Singles Chart—just as the Oasis original had done two months earlier—during Christmas 1995. On New Year's Day 1996, it earned a Silver certification from the British Phonographic Industry for sales greater than 200,000 copies. This cover also peaked within the top ten on the charts of Denmark, Ireland and Sweden.

Noel Gallagher mentioned that when BBC Radio 1 premiered the song, they jokingly claimed that they had found "the original version of Wonderwall". Gallagher, who had been in America at the time, was surprised to be asked by one of his record company's executives if he had actually written the song.

The Mike Flowers Pops cover was used in the 1997 film The Jackal, and also in the 1999 film Superstar.

Charts

Weekly charts

Year-end charts

Certifications

Cover versions
Ryan Adams' version, first performed in 2001, and later released in 2003 on Love Is Hell pt. 1 EP, was well received by Noel Gallagher. It was featured in The O.C. episode "The Heartbreak". It was featured in the final scenes of the Smallville Season 3 episode "Velocity" and the first season of the Israeli documentary series Couchsurfers. In an interview with Spin, Gallagher said "I think Ryan Adams is the only person who ever got that song right."

Paul Anka covered the song on his swing album Rock Swings, released in 2005 and was used as figure skater Paul Fentz's backing track during his 2018 Winter Olympics performance in Pyeongchang, South Korea. This version sparked an internet meme at the time. 

American rapper Jay-Z often has his crowds sing "Wonderwall" after his song "Jockin' Jay-Z", which includes a reference to Noel Gallagher's criticism of the rapper's involvement in the typically rock-centric Glastonbury Festival in 2008. It launched a war of words between Jay Z and Oasis, with Oasis' rhythm guitarist Gem Archer describing Jay Z's actions as akin to an "eight-year-old girl." After Oasis broke up, Jay Z later claimed he would like to work with Liam Gallagher.

Mashups
"Wonderwall" was featured in the popular mashup "Boulevard of Broken Songs" mixed by Party Ben in late 2004, which also contained parts of both Travis's "Writing to Reach You" and Green Day's "Boulevard of Broken Dreams". In late 2006, Gallagher accused Green Day of 'ripping off' "Wonderwall", saying "If you listen, you'll find it is exactly the same arrangement as "Wonderwall". They should have the decency to wait until I am dead [before stealing my songs]. I, at least, pay the people I steal from that courtesy".

Neil Cicierega's mashup albums Mouth Silence and Mouth Moods feature tracks that are mashups of "Wonderwall" titled "Wndrwll" and "Wallspin", the former a humorous remix featuring "Everywhere You Look" and the latter a mashup with "You Spin Me Round (Like A Record)".

In popular culture
"Wonderwall" is the team song of Minnesota United FC of Major League Soccer, sung after every home victory. The overarching fan organisation is MNWonderwall. Wonderwall is also played after all Manchester City F.C. home games.

See also
 List of best-selling singles in Australia
 List of number-one singles in Australia during the 1990s
 List of RPM Rock/Alternative number-one singles (Canada)
 List of number-one singles in 1996 (New Zealand)
 Number one modern rock hits of 1995
 Number one modern rock hits of 1996

References

1995 songs
1995 singles
Black-and-white music videos
Creation Records singles
Epic Records singles
London Records singles
The Mike Flowers Pops songs
Music videos directed by Nigel Dick
Number-one singles in Australia
Number-one singles in New Zealand
Number-one singles in Scotland
Oasis (band) songs
Rock ballads
Ryan Adams songs
Song recordings produced by Noel Gallagher
Songs written by Noel Gallagher
1990s ballads